Rashan Abdul Gary (born December 3, 1997) is an American football outside linebacker for the Green Bay Packers of the National Football League (NFL). In 2015, he concluded his high school football career at Paramus Catholic High School in New Jersey. He was ranked as the No. 1 recruit in college football's incoming Class of 2016. He played college football at Michigan.

High school career
Gary started his high school career at Scotch Plains-Fanwood High School, until he transferred to Paramus Catholic High School for his junior and senior seasons, after moving from Scotch Plains, where he lived with his father, to Plainfield with his mother. His first high school claimed that Paramus had recruited Gary, but the NJSIAA unanimously ruled that Scotch-Plains Fanwood had not proven its allegation. During his senior season, he had 13.5 sacks, 55 tackles, including 29 tackles for loss, four forced fumbles and returned a blocked punt for a touchdown in nine games. Following the season, Gary was named USA Today Defensive Player of the Year and High School All-American.

Gary participated in the 2016 Under Armour All-America Game, where he recorded six tackles and three sacks, and was named MVP.

Recruiting
He became the third player to be named the top player in the country unanimously by all four major recruiting networks, 247Sports.com, ESPN.com, Rivals.com, and Scout.com, following Jadeveon Clowney in 2011 and Robert Nkemdiche in 2013. In June 2015, Michigan hired Chris Partridge, Gary's former high school head coach, as their director of player personnel and recruiting. In January 2016, he was promoted to linebackers and special teams coach. After visits to Auburn, Clemson, Michigan, Ole Miss, and USC, Gary committed to play college football for the Michigan Wolverines on February 3, 2016.

College career

2016 season
As a freshman, Gary played in all thirteen games at defensive end, totaling 23 tackles, 5 tackles for loss, and 1 sack. He was named to the Pro Football Focus College Big Ten Defensive Team of the Week following his performance against UCF on September 10, 2016, in which he had 6 tackles and 2 tackles for loss, including 1 sack.

2017 season
During the 2017 season, Gary set career highs in tackles (58), tackles for loss (11.5) and sacks (5.5). Following the 2017 season, Gary was named to the All-Big Ten defensive first team by the coaches, and second team by the media as well as the Associated Press. He made his first career start against Florida in the Advocare Classic on September 2, 2017. After Michigan's game against Indiana on October 14, 2017, Gary was named Defensive Lineman of the Game. Against Maryland on November 11, 2017, Gary had five total tackles including half a tackle for loss earning him co-Defensive Lineman of the Game with Chase Winovich and Maurice Hurst as well as Pro Football Focus College Big Ten Defensive Team of the Week. Following his 2017 season, he was awarded the Richard Katcher Award for the most outstanding defensive lineman or outside linebacker on the 2017 Michigan Wolverines football team.

2018 season
Prior to the 2018 season, Gary was named an AP second-team preseason All-American. He was also placed on preseason watchlists for several national awards, including the Chuck Bednarik Award, Bronko Nagurski Trophy, Walter Camp Award, and Ted Hendricks Award.

Gary recorded 38 total tackles during the 2018 season, including 6.5 tackles for a loss, and 3.5 sacks. Gary struggled with a shoulder injury throughout the season, which caused him to see limited playing time in late September and miss the entirety of October games for the Wolverines. Regardless, following the season, he was named to the All-Big Ten defensive first-team by the coaches, and second-team by the media.

On November 26, 2018, after the conclusion of Michigan's regular season, Gary announced he would forgo his senior season to enter the 2019 NFL Draft. He decided to sit out the Wolverines' bowl game, the Peach Bowl against Florida, to prepare for the draft.

College statistics

Professional career

Before the 2019 NFL Draft, Gary founded his own sports agency, Rashan Gary Sports. As of January 2019, the agency has two clients, himself and fellow 2019 NFL prospect Montre Gregory, a defensive back from Bowling Green. Gary stated that he intended to expand the agency to recruit players from the NBA, MLB, and NHL.

Gary was drafted 12th overall by the Green Bay Packers in the 2019 NFL Draft. Packers scouts said that Gary, who primarily played defensive end in college, would play outside linebacker for Green Bay. Days after the draft, it was revealed that Gary was dealing with a torn labrum in his right shoulder. On May 3, 2019, Gary signed his rookie contract with the Packers. The four-year contract is worth $15.88 million, including a $9.57 million signing bonus During a week 3 game against the Denver Broncos, Gary sacked quarterback Joe Flacco recording his first career sack.  In Week 15 against the Chicago Bears, Gary recorded 3 tackles and a sack on Mitchell Trubisky in the 21–13 win.

In Week 2 of the 2020 season against the Detroit Lions, Gary led the team with 1.5 sacks on Matthew Stafford during the 42–21 win. Gary finished the season with 5 sacks in a rotational role with 259 defensive snaps despite his limited playing time, Next Gen Stats named him 9th on a list of the 10 most disruptive defenders in 2020. In the Divisional Round of the playoffs against the Los Angeles Rams, Gary recorded 1.5 sacks on Jared Goff during the 32–18 win.

In 2021, he started full-time at outside linebacker with teammate Za'Darius Smith knocked out from injury. He led all NFC defensive linemen in pressures through Week 12 of the season. He finished the season with a career-best 9.5 sacks and 81 pressures, which finished for third in the league among all edge rushers. During the Packers' playoff loss to the San Francisco 49ers, Gary produced two first-half sacks on 49ers quarterback Jimmy Garoppolo, and caused a turnover on downs by stuffing a 4th and 1 run with 6 minutes to play. The Packers' defense limited the 49ers' offense to just 6 points; however, an especially poor special teams performance produced a 10-point swing against the Packers as they lost 13–10.

The Packers picked up the fifth-year option on Gary's contract on April 29, 2022.

In the Packers Week 9 loss to the Detroit Lions, Gary tore his ACL which ended his season.

NFL career statistics

Regular season

Postseason

References

External links
Green Bay Packers bio
Michigan Wolverines bio

1997 births
Living people
American football defensive tackles
Green Bay Packers players
Michigan Wolverines football players
Paramus Catholic High School alumni
People from Scotch Plains, New Jersey
Players of American football from New Jersey
Scotch Plains-Fanwood High School alumni
Sportspeople from Plainfield, New Jersey